Vysoke, rural localities in Ukraine, may refer to:

 Vysoke, Nizhyn Raion, Chernihiv Oblast, a village in Nizhyn Raion
 Vysoke, Krynychky Raion, Dnipropetrovsk Oblast, a village
 Vysoke, Nikopol Raion, Dnipropetrovsk Oblast, a village
 Vysoke, Tomakivka Raion, Dnipropetrovsk Oblast, a village
 Vysoke, Donetsk Oblast
 Vysoke, Kherson Oblast, a village
 Vysoke, Kyiv Oblast, a village
 Vysoke, Hrebinka Raion, Poltava Oblast, a village
 Vysoke, Lokhvytsia Raion, Poltava Oblast, a village
 Vysoke, Pyriatyn Raion, Poltava Oblast, a village
 Vysoke, Zinkiv Raion, Poltava Oblast, a village
 Vysoke, Kherson Oblast, a village in Beryslav Raion
 Vysoke, Krasnopillia Raion, Sumy Oblast, a village
 Vysoke, Okhtyrka Raion, Sumy Oblast, a village
 Vysoke, Vinnytsia Oblast, a village
 Vysoke, Volyn Oblast, a village
 Vysoke, Melitopol Raion, Zaporizhzhia Oblast, a village
 Vysoke, Mykhailivka Raion, Zaporizhzhia Oblast, a village

See also
 Vysoké
 Vysokoye (disambiguation)
 Vysokaye (disambiguation)

uk:Високе#Україна